The Pembroke Coast Express was a named train operated by British Railways which began running in 1953 along with several other services, as a way of better promoting faster or more direct services. In 2006, the name was used by First Great Western to advertise its Summer Saturday service between London Paddington and Pembroke Dock.

Current operation
The up service from Pembroke Dock departs at 10:01 and the service from London Paddington leaves at 08:45.

References

External links
 Meet out trains
 Train times
 Pembroke Coast Express identification

Named passenger trains of British Rail
Rail transport in England
Rail transport in Wales
Railway services introduced in 1953
1953 establishments in England
1953 establishments in Wales